Hyalurga modesta is a moth of the family Erebidae. It was described by Heinrich Benno Möschler in 1878. It is found in Suriname and French Guiana.

References

Hyalurga
Moths described in 1878